The Collection is a compilation album by English band Strawbs.

Track listing

"Part of the Union" (Richard Hudson, John Ford) – 2:54
"I'll Carry on Beside You" (Cousins) – 3:09
"The Man Who Called Himself Jesus" (Cousins) – 3:50
"Oh How She Changed" (Cousins, Tony Hooper) – 2:52
"I Turned My Face into the Wind" (Cousins) – 2:42
"Song of a Sad Little Girl" (Cousins) – 5:28
"Witchwood" (Cousins) – 3:23
"Benedictus" (Cousins) – 4:24
"Heavy Disguise" (Ford) – 2:53
"Keep the Devil Outside" (Ford) – 3:02
"Shine on Silver Sun" (Cousins) – 2:46
"Grace Darling" (Cousins) – 3:55
"Lemon Pie" (Cousins) – 4:03
"Martin Luther King's Dream" (Cousins) – 2:53
"Tokyo Rosie" (Cousins) – 2:48
"Will Ye Go" (Francis McPeake) – 3:54
"I Only Want My Love to Grow in You" (Cousins, Chas Cronk) – 3:00
"Lay Down" (Cousins) – 4:31

Personnel

Dave Cousins – vocals, acoustic guitar, electric guitar, dulcimer, piano (all tracks except 9)
Tony Hooper – vocals, acoustic guitar (tracks 2–8,10,14)
Dave Lambert – vocals, electric guitar (tracks 1,11–13,15–18)
Ron Chesterman – double bass (tracks 3–5)
John Ford – bass guitar, acoustic guitar, vocals (tracks 1–2,6–10,14,16,18)
Chas Cronk – bass guitar, vocals (tracks 11–13,15,17)
Rick Wakeman – keyboards, clavinet (tracks 2,6–7,10,14–15)
Blue Weaver – keyboards, accordion (tracks 1,8,16,18)
John Hawken – keyboards (tracks 11–13)
Robert Kirby – keyboards (track 17)
John Mealing – keyboards (track 17)
Richard Hudson – drums, vocals (tracks 1–2,6–8,10,14,16,18)
Rod Coombes – drums, vocals (tracks 11–13,15,17)

Release history

References
The Collection on Strawbsweb

2002 compilation albums
Strawbs compilation albums